Samuel Gilbert Post (November 17, 1896 in Richmond, Virginia – March 31, 1971 in Portsmouth, Virginia), is a former professional baseball player who played first base in nine games for the 1922 Brooklyn Robins.

He was later the manager of the Salem Witches in the New England League during the 1930 season.

External links

1896 births
1971 deaths
Major League Baseball first basemen
Brooklyn Robins players
Baseball players from Richmond, Virginia
Minor league baseball managers
Rochester Colts players
Reading Aces players
Bridgeport Americans players
Springfield Ponies players
Lynn Papooses players
Hartford Senators players